The 21st Legislative Assembly of British Columbia sat from 1946 to 1949. The members were elected in the British Columbia general election held in October 1945. The Liberals and Conservatives formed a coalition government led by John Hart. The Co-operative Commonwealth Federation led by Harold Winch formed the official opposition. Hart retired as premier in December 1947 and was replaced by Byron Ingemar "Boss" Johnson.

Norman William Whittaker served as speaker for the assembly until September 1947. Robert Henry Carson then served as speaker until January 1949. Former premier John Hart became speaker the following month.

Members of the 21st General Assembly 
The following members were elected to the assembly in 1945:

Notes:

Party standings

By-elections 
By-elections were held to replace members for various reasons:

Notes:

References 

Political history of British Columbia
Terms of British Columbia Parliaments
1946 establishments in British Columbia
1949 disestablishments in British Columbia
20th century in British Columbia